Muzio Colonna (1596–1632) was a Roman Catholic prelate who served as Bishop of Marsi (1629–1632).

Biography
Muzio Colonna was born on 12 Aug 1596 in Rome, Italy.
On 17 Sep 1629, he was appointed during the papacy of Pope Urban VI as Bishop of Marsi.
On 13 Dec 1629, he was consecrated bishop by Carlo Emmanuele Pio di Savoia, Cardinal-Bishop of Albano, with Alessandro Filonardi, Bishop of Aquino, and Ranuccio Scotti Douglas, Bishop of Borgo San Donnino, 
serving as co-consecrators. 
He served as Bishop of Marsi until his death on 5 Sep 1632.

References

External links and additional sources
 (for Chronology of Bishops)
 (for Chronology of Bishops)

17th-century Italian Roman Catholic bishops
Bishops appointed by Pope Urban VI
1596 births
1632 deaths
Colonna family